Thomas Clay McCreery (December 12, 1816July 10, 1890) was a Democratic U.S. Senator from Kentucky.

Born at Yelvington, Kentucky, McCreery graduated from Centre College, in Danville, Kentucky, in 1837. He studied law, passed the bar, and commenced practice in Frankfort, Kentucky. He then returned to Owensboro and engaged in literary pursuits.

He ran unsuccessfully for election in 1842 to the Twenty-eighth Congress, and again in 1844 to the Twenty-ninth Congress. He served as a presidential elector on the Democratic tickets in 1852, 1856, and 1860. He was finally elected as a Democrat to the United States Senate to fill the vacancy caused by the resignation of James Guthrie, and served from February 19, 1868, to March 3, 1871. However, McCreery faced many accusations by then-Governor John W. Stevenson, of helping hated former Union General Steven G. Burbridge obtain a position as revenue collector, and lost to Stevenson in the following election. McCreery was again elected to the United States Senate in 1872 and served from March 4, 1873, to March 3, 1879, when he declined to be a candidate for reelection. He retired from public life and lived on his farm in Daviess County, Kentucky, and moved back to Owensboro, where he died and was interred in Rosehill Elmwood Cemetery.

References

1816 births
1890 deaths
Politicians from Owensboro, Kentucky
Centre College alumni
Kentucky lawyers
Kentucky Democrats
Democratic Party United States senators from Kentucky
19th-century American politicians
19th-century American lawyers